Dennis Marshall Herron (born 18 December 1959) is a Costa Rican footballer. He competed in the men's tournament at the 1980 Summer Olympics.

He is the father of Dennis Marshall, who also played for the Costa Rica national team.

References

External links
 

1959 births
Living people
Costa Rican footballers
Costa Rica international footballers
Olympic footballers of Costa Rica
Footballers at the 1980 Summer Olympics
Footballers from San José, Costa Rica
Association footballers not categorized by position